Jeroen Simaeys (born 12 May 1985) is a Belgian former footballer who played as a centre back. Simaeys suffered an injury in the beginning of 2017 and was forced to retire several months later when it became apparent he would no longer be able to play professional football.

Club career
He joined Genk on 30 July 2011. He has previously played for Club Brugge, Sint-Truiden, Oud-Heverlee Leuven, Butsel and Mechelen.

National team career
He made his debut for the senior Belgium national football team in a friendly against Luxembourg on 18 November 2008.

He competed for Belgium at the 2008 Summer Olympics.

Honours
Genk
Belgian Cup (1): 2012–13

References

Guardian Football

1985 births
Living people
Belgian footballers
Belgium international footballers
Oud-Heverlee Leuven players
Sint-Truidense V.V. players
Club Brugge KV players
K.R.C. Genk players
PFC Krylia Sovetov Samara players
Sportspeople from Mechelen
Footballers from Antwerp Province
Association football midfielders
Belgian Pro League players
Footballers at the 2008 Summer Olympics
Olympic footballers of Belgium
Expatriate footballers in Russia
Russian Premier League players